List of communities in Cumberland County, Nova Scotia

Communities are ordered by the highway upon which they are located.  All routes start with the terminus located near the largest community.

Trunk Routes

Trunk 2: Fort Lawrence - Amherst - Upper Nappan - Fenwick - Springhill Junction - Springhill - Mapleton - Southampton - West Brook - Halfway River - Lakelands - Parrsboro - Moose River
Trunk 4: Thompson Station - Oxford - Mahoney's Corner - Wentworth Centre - Wentworth - Wentworth Station
Trunk 6: Amherst - Truemanville - Amherst Head - Shinimicas Bridge - Linden - Port Howe - Port Philip - Pugwash - Wallace

Arterial Highways

Highway 104: Fort Lawrence - Amherst - Oxford - Thompson Station
Highway 142: Springhill - Salt Springs

Collector Roads

Route 204: Amherst - Salem - Little River - West Leicester - Mansfield - Oxford - Hansford - South Victoria - Streets Ridge
Route 209: Parrsboro - Kirkhill - Diligent River - Fox River - Port Greville - Wards Brook - Fraserville - Spencer's Island - Advocate Harbour - New Salem - Apple River - East Apple River - Sand River - Shulie - Joggins
Route 242: Joggins - River Hebert - Maccan
Route 301: Oxford - Kolbec - Port Howe
Route 302: Amherst - Nappan - Maccan - Athol - Southampton
Route 307: Wallace - Wallace Station - Wentworth Centre
Route 321: Springhill - River Philip - Oxford Junction - Oxford - Port Philip
Route 366: Amherst - Tidnish Bridge - Tidnish -Lorneville, Northport - Linden  - Port Howe
Route 368: Mahoney's Corner - Streets Ridge - Middleboro

Communities located on rural roads

Amherst Point
Barronsfield
Black Rock
Chapman Settlement
Chignecto
Collingwood Corner
Conns Mills
East Mapleton
Eatonville, Nova Scotia (ghost town)
Farmington
Fox Harbour
Greenville Station
Gulf Shore
Harrison Settlement
Hastings
Jacksons Point
Malagash
Mill Creek
Minudie
Mount Pleasant
New Canaan
New Yarmouth
North Shore
Pugwash Junction
Rose
South Brook
Stonehouse
Victoria
Wallace Ridge
Westchester Station
Williamsdale
Wyvern

See also

Cumberland County, Nova Scotia

Geography of Cumberland County, Nova Scotia